The 2020 Fordham Rams football team represented Fordham University in the 2020–21 NCAA Division I FCS football season. They were led by third-year head coach Joe Conlin and played their home games at Coffey Field as a member of the Patriot League.

On July 13, 2020, the Patriot League announced that it would cancel its fall sports seasons due to the COVID-19 pandemic. The league announced a spring schedule on February 5, with the first games set to be played on March 13.

Schedule
Fordham had games scheduled against Stony Brook on August 29, Bryant on September 5, and Hawaii on September 12, which were all later canceled before the start of the 2020 season.

References

Fordham
Fordham Rams football seasons
Fordham Rams football